António de Albuquerque Coelho (1682–1745) was the Governor of Macau from 1718 to 1719. In 1722 he was appointed Colonial Governor of Portuguese Timor. He almost did not make it to Macau as the captain of the ship that was to take him to Macau left him in Goa instead. Later, in East Timor, he was besieged by Topasses during his three years of services there.

References 

Governors of Macau
Governors of Portuguese Timor
18th-century politicians
1682 births
1745 deaths